Mission Asteroid (shown as Mission: Asteroid in the manual and on the title screen) is a graphic adventure game for the Apple II written by Ken and Roberta Williams and released in 1980 by On-Line Systems. It was later ported to the Atari 8-bit family and Commodore 64.

The game was released as Hi-Res Adventures #0, despite being released after Mystery House and Wizard and the Princess. It was meant as an introduction to the adventure game genre so it was made easier than the rest of Hi-Res Adventures games.

Reception

Mark Marlow reviewed Mission: Asteroid,  Mystery House, and The Wizard and the Princess for Computer Gaming World, and stated that "Mission: Asteroid is the simplest of the group and only requires a few hours to solve."

References

External links
Apple II manual at archive.org
Mission Asteroid at Atari Mania
Mission Asteroid at Gamebase 64

1980 video games
Adventure games
Apple II games
Atari 8-bit family games
Commodore 64 games
FM-7 games
NEC PC-8801 games
NEC PC-9801 games
ScummVM-supported games
Sierra Entertainment games
Fiction about near-Earth asteroids
Video games developed in the United States